Sexhow railway station was a railway station built to serve the hamlet of Sexhow in North Yorkshire, England. Sexhow station was closed in 1954 to passengers and four years later to goods.

History
Mapping shows the station to have had three sidings in the goods yard, coal drops and a crane. The main station buildings were on the westbound (Picton direction) side of the station. The station was south of the village that it served, and was actually in the parish of Carlton in Cleveland, which has led to speculation that it was named Sexhow to avoid confusion with  railway station, which was originally named Carlton.

Bradshaw's timetable of 1877 shows five out and back workings between Stockton railway station and Whitby, with connections advertised in Middlesbrough. Return services were just five a day with four coming from Whitby. The other service from Whitby reversed at Battersby and went to Stockton via  railway station. By 1946, eight years before closure, the service was down to just three stopping services each way per day, with most of the services from Whitby to Stockton reversing at Battersby and going via Middlesbrough.

The station closed to passengers in June 1954, and then closed completely in December 1958, having been used for goods traffic.

References

External links

Disused railway stations in North Yorkshire
Former North Eastern Railway (UK) stations
Railway stations in Great Britain opened in 1857
Railway stations in Great Britain closed in 1958